The 2018–19 TFF First League is the 18th season since the league was established in 2001 and 56th season of the second-level football league of Turkey since its establishment in 1963–64.

Teams 
Osmanlıspor, Gençlerbirliği and Kardemir Karabükspor relegated from 2017–18 Süper Lig.
Rizespor, Ankaragücü and Erzurum BB promoted to 2018–19 Süper Lig.
Altay, Hatayspor and Afjet Afyonspor promoted from 2017–18 TFF Second League.
Samsunspor, Manisaspor and Gaziantepspor relegated to 2018–19 TFF Second League.

Stadiums and locations

League table

Positions by round
The table lists the positions of teams after each week of matches. In order to preserve chronological evolvements, any postponed matches are not included to the round at which they were originally scheduled, but added to the full round they were played immediately afterwards.

Results

Promotion Playoffs

Semifinals

|}

Final

Statistics

Top goalscorers

See also 
 2018–19 Turkish Cup
 2018–19 Süper Lig
 2018–19 TFF Second League
 2018–19 TFF Third League

References

External links 
  Turkish Football Federation PTT 1. League

TFF First League seasons
Turkey
2018–19 in Turkish football